Ånderdalen National Park is located on the large island of Senja in Troms og Finnmark county, Norway.  The  park lies within Senja Municipality. The park was established by royal decree on 6 February 1970 and it was enlarged in 2004. The national park preserves this Northern Norwegian coastal landscape. The bedrock consists of hard granite rocks and the landscape image gives exciting impressions of the glacial forces that have worked on Senja. The coastal pine forest in Ånderdalen has in some areas primeval forest with over 600 years old trees and countless marble pines and lower. Along the river there are many lush hawked birch forests and floodplain forests.

The national park had no moose before 1940, but it now has a permanent population. It is also an important calving and grazing area for semi-domesticated reindeer. The most common smaller animals are red foxes, stoats, hares, small rodents, and two species of shrews. Seals occur at the heads of the fjords and otters are often seen along rivers. Trout and char are common, and salmon run right up the river to the lake Åndervatn.

Name
The last element is the finite form of dal which means "dale" or "valley". The meaning of the first element is unknown. In the valley and the park are similar names such as the river Ånderelva and the lake Åndervatnet.

References

External links
 Map of Ånderdalen National Park

National parks of Norway
Protected areas established in 1970
Tourist attractions in Troms og Finnmark
Protected areas of Troms og Finnmark
1970 establishments in Norway
Senja